Oh How We Danced is the debut studio album by the British musician Jim Capaldi.
The album was recorded while Traffic was on hiatus due to Steve Winwood's struggles with peritonitis and was released by Island Records in 1972. Like his contemporary albums with Traffic, it was unsuccessful in his native United Kingdom but did better in the United States, reaching number 82 in the Billboard 200 chart and producing the hit single "Eve", which reached number 91 in the Billboard Hot 100.

The track "Open Your Heart" is a surplus recording from Traffic's then most recent album, The Low Spark of High Heeled Boys. All of the remaining tracks, save "How Much Can a Man Really Take?", were recorded at Muscle Shoals Sound Studios with the Muscle Shoals Rhythm Section.

Reception

Critical reception for Oh How We Danced was resoundingly positive. Rolling Stone applauded Capaldi's clever yet earnest lyrics and the strong collection of guest musicians, concluding that the album has "not a whiff of mediocrity to be heard." Allmusic's retrospective review complimented the strong set of songs and "its mellow vibe, generated by the genial familiarity of the players". They also made note of "Capaldi's sweet, unassuming voice", an echo of Rolling Stone'''s reference to his "sweet smooth easy voice." In a review for the 2012 reissue of the album, Terry Stauntman of the British magazine Classic Rock'' described the album as very close to Traffic latest works, with the difference that "the more soulful side of the band is given a sharper focus".

Track listing
All tracks composed by Jim Capaldi, except where indicated.
Side one
 "Eve" – 3:39
 "Big Thirst" (Jim Capaldi, Dave Mason) – 5:27
 "Love Is All You Can Try" – 3:23
 "Last Day of Dawn" – 4:24

Side two
 "Don't Be a Hero" – 5:58
 "Open Your Heart" – 4:04
 "How Much Can a Man Really Take?" – 5:21
 "Anniversary Song" (Saul Chaplin, Al Jolson) – 4:28 [Mislabeled on some releases as "Oh How We Danced"]

One further track, "Going Down Slow All the Way", was recorded at an unidentified studio in England and released as the b-side to the single "Eve". The track features only piano, tambourine, bass drum, and a single vocal, all presumably played by Jim Capaldi, who produced the track by himself. It was included as bonus of the 2012 CD release of the album.

Personnel
 Jim Capaldi – lead vocals, piano (track 6), acoustic guitar (track 4)

Muscle Shoals Rhythm Section
(except tracks 6-7)
 David Hood – bass
 Roger Hawkins – drums
 Barry Beckett – piano, organ (tracks 1, 5)
 Jimmy Johnson – electric guitar

Additional musicians
 Paul Kossoff – electric guitar (tracks 2, 4-5, 7-8)
 Dave Mason – harmonica (track 2) electric guitar solo (track 5)
 Steve Winwood – organ (track 1, 6), backing vocal (track 6), guitar (track 3)
 Chris Wood – flute (track 7), electric saxophone (track 6)
 Ric Grech – bass (track 6)
 Jim Gordon – drums (track 6)
 Rebop Kwaku Baah – percussion (tracks 4, 6), congas (track 7)
 Trevor Burton – bass (track 7)
 Mike Kellie – drums (track 7)
 Bob Griffin – piano (track 7)
 Sunny Leslie – backing vocal (track 2)

Technical
 Chris Blackwell, Jim Capaldi – producers
 Brian Humphries, Jerry Masters – engineer
 Neal Preston – cover photography

References

External links
Jim Capaldi's official website

1972 debut albums
Jim Capaldi albums
Albums produced by Chris Blackwell
Albums recorded at Muscle Shoals Sound Studio
Island Records albums